"Open Country" is a designation used for some UK access land. 

It was first defined under the National Parks and Access to the Countryside Act 1949 (and extended by the Countryside Act 1968), and was land over which an appropriate access agreement had been made. In particular significant upland areas of the northern Peak District, where there had been much dispute over access prior to World War II, were so designated (see Mass trespass of Kinder Scout).

The term is also used in the Countryside and Rights of Way Act 2000 to describe 'areas of mountain, moor, heath and down' that are generally available for access under that Act. (It appears that the rights conferred by this new definition are in general less comprehensive than those conferred under the 1949 Act, but will apply to a wider area.)

The Countryside Agency's publication Managing Public Access appears to envisage that most land originally designated under the 1949 Act will in due course receive redesignation under the CRoW Act, as the original access agreements lapse.

References

External links
Open Country; BBC Radio 4

Law of the United Kingdom
Walking in the United Kingdom
Freedom to roam